Route 959, or Highway 959, may refer to:

Belgium
N959, a National Road in Belgium

Israel
Route 959 (Israel)

Philippines
N959 highway (Philippines)

United States
  (future Alabama state route designation for )